USS Bonita has been the name of more than one ship of the United States Navy, and may refer to:

, originally named USS Bonita, a submarine in commission from 1909 to 1919
, a patrol vessel commissioned in 1917 and sunk in 1918
, originally named USS V-3 (SF-6), a submarine in commission from 1926 to 1937 and from 1940 to 1945
, originally named USS K-3, a submarine in commission from 1952 to 1958

Note
A brig engaged in the African slave trade captured on 10 October 1860 has been identified both as Bonita and Bonito but never was part of the United States Navy.

See also

United States Navy ship names